Barku Sara (also Romanized as Bārkū Sarā; also known as Bargū Sarā and Bārgū Sarā) is a village in Shirju Posht Rural District, Rudboneh District, Lahijan County, Gilan Province, Iran. At the 2006 census, its population was 1,645, in 478 families.

References 

Populated places in Lahijan County